Scum Lake may refer to one of two lakes in Canada:
Scum Lake (British Columbia), a lake in Chilcotin District, British Columbia
Scum Lake (Ontario), a lake in Thunder Bay District, Ontario